Orly Lobel is an author and Warren Distinguished Professor of Law at the University of San Diego (USD) School of Law. Lobel is one of the nation's foremost legal experts on labor and employment law. She is also one of the nation's top-cited young legal scholars. Along with numerous scholarly articles and dozens of essays for media publications, Lobel has written and published three books for general audiences. Her most recent book, The Equality Machine: Harnessing Digital Technology for a Brighter, More Inclusive Future (PublicAffairs 2022), was named one of The Economist's Best Books of 2022.

Early life and education 
Lobel graduated top of her class from Tel-Aviv University Faculty of Law in 1998. While attending law school in Tel-Aviv, Lobel was selected to represent the university as a semester exchange student at Northwestern School of Law. She earned her LL.M from Harvard Law School in 2000 before completing her Doctor of Juridicial Science at Harvard Law in 2006. Lobel also served as an intelligence commander in the Israel Defense Forces and clerked on the Israeli Supreme Court.

Legal career
Lobel is a Warren Distinguished Professor of Law at the University of San Diego School of Law. She is a founding member of the USD School of Law's Center for Intellectual Property and Markets and the director of the Center for Employment & Labor Policy.

Lobel has lectured and taught law students and MBA students at places such as the Yale Law School, University of California, San Diego, Tel-Aviv Law School and Beijing University. Prior to joining USD, she served as a fellow at the Harvard University Center for Ethics and the Professions, the Kennedy School of Government, and the Weatherhead Center for International Affairs. 

Lobel is a member of the American Law Institute.  Lobel is a mentor for the Racial Equity in Technology Policy Accelerator – a program that aims to identify, develop, and publish a set of racial justice and technology policy ideas to be implemented by the legislative and executive branches of government.

Research 
Lobel is one of the nation's top-cited legal scholars on labor and employment law. She is also one of the nation's top-cited young legal scholars. She has written over 40 articles published in leading law journals including the Harvard Law Journal, the Colombia Law Review and more.

Lobel has been interviewed by The New York Times, BusinessWeek, and NPR’s Marketplace. In 2015, Lobel delivered a TEDx talk entitled "Secrets & Sparks".

Lobel’s work has appeared in The Economist, The Wall Street Journal, Forbes, Fortune, Financial Times, Times Literary Supplement, La Repubblica, La Presse, The Australian, Times Higher Education, Above the Law, Modern Law, Yahoo!LifeStyle (Must-read books), NPR, TechDirt, The San Diego Union-Tribune, The San Francisco Chronicle, The National Law Journal, Harvard Magazine, The Sunday Times, Globe and Mail, Huffington Post, CNBC, and CNN Business.

Awards and Recognition 
Lobel has received the Thorsnes Prize for Outstanding Legal Scholarship and the Irving Oberman Memorial Award. In 2013, Lobel was named one of the 50 Sharpest Minds in Research by The Marker Magazine.

Bibliography
   Books
The Equality Machine: Harnessing Digital Technology for a Brighter, More Inclusive Future, PublicAffairs, 2022
Talent Wants to Be Free: Why We Should Learn to Love Leaks, Raids, and Free Riding (Yale University Press)
You Don't Own Me: How Mattel v. MGA Entertainment Exposed Barbie's Dark Side (W.W. Norton and Company 2017)
Encyclopedia of Labor and Employment Law and Economics (Edward Elgar Publishing, 2009), Co-Editor.
Employment Law (6th ed., West Academic Hornbook Series 2019) (with with Rothstein et al.)

   Academic publications
Biopolitical Opportunities: Between Datafication and Governance, 96 Notre Dame Law Review Reflection 181 (2021)
Boilerplate Collusion: Clause Aggregation, Antitrust Law & Contract Governance, 106 Minnesota Law Review 877 (2021)
Exit, Voice & Innovation, 57 Houston Law Review 781 (2020)
Gentlemen Prefer Bonds: How Employers Fix the Talent Market, 59 Santa Clara Law Review 663 (2020)
Knowledge Pays: Reversing Information Flows & The Future of Pay Equity, 120 Columbia Law Review 547 (2020)
Non-Competes, Human Capital Policy & Regional Competition, 45 Journal of Corporation Law 931 (2020)
We Are All Gig Workers Now: Online Platforms, Freelancers and The Battles Over Employment Status and Rights During the COVID-19 Pandemic, 57 San Diego Law Review 919 (202
The Goldilocks Path of Legal Scholarship in a Digital Networked World, 50 Loyola University Chicago Law Journal 403 (2019)
Platform Market Power, 32 Berkeley Technology Law Journal 1051 (2018) (with Bamberger)
The NFL as a Workplace: The Prospect of Applying Occupational Health and Safety Law to Protect NFL Workers, 60 Arizona Law Review 291 (2018) (with Finkel et al.)
The DTSA and the New Secrecy Ecology, 1 Business, Entrepreneurship & Tax Law Journal 369 (2017)
The Gig Economy and the Future of Employment and Labor Law, 51 University of San Francisco Law Review 51 (2017)
Economic Espionage as Reality or Rhetoric: Prosperity as a Component of National Security, 20 Lewis and Clark Law Review 419 (2016) (with Dreyfuss)
Enforceability TBD: From Status to Contract in Intellectual Property Law, 96 Boston University Law Review 869 (2016)
The Law of the Platform, 101 Minnesota Law Review 87 (2016)
The New Cognitive Property: Human Capital Law and the Reach of Intellectual Property, 93 Texas Law Review 789 (2015)
Driving Performance: A Growth Theory of Non-Compete Law, 16 Stanford Technology Law Review 833 (2013) (with Amir)
Linking Prevention, Detection, and Whistle-Blowing: Principles for Designing Effective Reporting Systems, 54 South Texas Law Review 37 (2013)
Liberalism and Lifestyle: Informing Regulatory Governance with Behavioral Research, European Journal of Risk Regulation 17 (2012) (with Amir)
The Incentives Matrix: The Comparative Effectiveness of Rewards, Liabilities, Duties and Protections for Reporting Illegality, 88 Texas Law Review 1151 (2010) (with Feldman)
Citizenship, Organizational Citizenship, and the Laws of Overlapping Obligations, 97 California Law Review 433 (2009)
Lawyering Loyalties: Speech Rights and Duties within 21st Century New Governance, 77 Fordham Law Review 1245 (2009)
Behavioral Versus Institutional Antecedents of Decentralized Enforcement in Organizations: An Experimental Approach, 2 Regulations & Governance 165 (2008) (with Feldman)
Stumble, Predict, Nudge: How Behavioral Economics Informs Law and Policy, 108 Columbia Law Review 2098 (2008) (with Amir)
Big-Box Benefits: The Targeting of Giants in a National Campaign to Raise Work Conditions, 39 Connecticut Law Review (2007)
The Paradox of Extra-Legal Activism: Critical Legal Consciousness and Transformative Politics, 120 Harvard Law Review 937 (2007)
Reflections on Gender Equality and the Regulation of Sexuality in the Workplace: A Response to Kim Yuracko, 43 San Diego Law Review 899 (2006)
Sustainable Capitalism or Ethical Transnationalism: Off-Shore Production and Economic Development, 17 Journal of Asian Economics 56 (2006)
The Four Pillars of Work Law, 104 Michigan Law Review 1539 (2006)
Walmartization and the Fair Share Health Care Acts, 19 St. Thomas Law Review 105 (2006) (with Contreras)
Formulating a New Paradigm: Newness and the Ripeness of the Moment, 2005 Wisconsin Law Review 479 (2005)
Interlocking Regulatory and Industrial Relations: The Governance of Workplace Safety, 57 Administrative Law Review 1071 (2005)
Gender Discriminatory Behavior During Adolescence and Young Adulthood: A Developmental Analysis, 33 Journal of Youth and Adolescence (2004) (with Lobel, Nov-Krispin, Schiller & Feldman)
Setting the Agenda for New Governance Research, 89 Minnesota Law Review 498 (2004)
The Renew Deal: The Fall of Regulation and the Rise of Governance in Contemporary Legal Thought, 89 Minnesota Law Review 342 (2004)
Orchestrated Experimentalism in the Regulation of Work, 101 Michigan Law Review 2146 (2003)
The Law of Social Time, 76 Temple Law Review 357 (2003)
The Slipperiness of Stability: Contracting for Flexible and Triangular Employment Relationships in the New Economy, 10 Texas Wesleyan Law Review 109 (2003)
Family Geographies: Global Care Chains, Transnational Parenthood, and New Legal Challenges in an Era of Labor Globalization, 5 Current Legal Issues 383 (2002)
Agency and Coercion in Labor and Employment Relations: Four Dimensions of Power in Shifting Patterns of Work, 4 University of Pennsylvania Journal of Labor and Employment Law 121 (2001)
Class and Care: The Roles of Private Intermediaries in the In-home Care Industries in the United States and Israel, 24 Harvard Women's Law Journal 89 (2001)

References

External links 

SSRN Faculty Page
Google Scholar Page

Israeli writers
Living people
Harvard Law School alumni
Tel Aviv University alumni
Year of birth missing (living people)